The executive departments of the Philippines are the largest component of the executive branch of the government of the Philippines. These departments comprise the largest part of the country's bureaucracy.

Current executive departments 
All departments are listed by their present-day name with their English names on top and Filipino names at the bottom. Department heads are listed at the Cabinet of the Philippines article.

Former executive departments 
The departments listed below are defunct agencies which have been abolished, integrated, reorganized or renamed into the existing executive departments of the Philippines.

First Republic 
 Department of Agriculture, Industry and Commerce
 Department of Communications and Public Works
 Department of the Interior
 Department of Foreign Relations
 Department of Public Education
 Department of Wars and Marine

Commonwealth Period 
 Department of Agriculture and Commerce
 Department of Agriculture and Natural Resources
 Department of Commerce and Police
 Department of Health and Public Welfare
 Department of Finance and Justice
 Department of Instruction
 Department of Labor
 Department of National Defense
 Department of Public Instruction

Third Republic 
 Department of Agriculture and Natural Resources
 Department of Commerce and Industry
 Department of General Services  
 Department of Social Welfare

Martial Law Era (Fourth Republic) 
 Ministry of Agriculture and Food
 Ministry of Education and Culture
 Ministry of Education, Culture and Sports
 Ministry of Human Settlements
 Ministry of Industry
 Ministry of Labor
 Ministry of Local Government and Community Development
 Ministry of National Defense
 Ministry of Natural Resources
 Ministry of Public Highways
 Ministry of Public Information
 Ministry of Public Works, Transportation and Communications
 Ministry of Social Services and Development
 Ministry of Trade and Tourism
 Ministry of Youth and Sports Development

Fifth Republic 
 Department of Education, Culture and Sports
 Department of Environment, Energy and Natural Resources
 Department of Land Reform
 Department of Transportation and Communications

Agencies elevated to department rank 
 Budget Commission → Ministry of Budget and Management (1978)
 National Science and Technology Authority → Department of Science and Technology (1987)
 Office of Energy Affairs → Department of Energy (1992)
 Office of Information and Communications Technology → Department of Information and Communications Technology (2016)
 Housing and Urban Development Coordinating Council → Department of Human Settlements and Urban Development (2019)
 Philippine Overseas Employment Administration → Department of Migrant Workers (2021)

Proposed executive departments 
 "Department of Sports"
 "Department of Fisheries and Aquatic Resources", proposed by Senator Francis Pangilinan and House Speaker Alan Peter Cayetano.
 "Department of Culture" or "Department of Arts and Culture"
 "Department of Water Resources"
 "Department of Disaster Resilience"

See also 
 Cabinet of the Philippines – the heads of the executive departments of the Philippines
 List of Cabinets of the Philippines

References

External links 
 Philippine government portal